Claire Philouze (born 15 July 1998) is a French female acrobatic gymnast. With partner Léa Roussel, Philouze achieved bronze in the 2014 Acrobatic Gymnastics World Championships.

With Léa Roussel, she reached the final of the seventh series of France's got talent in December 2012, finishing in fourth place.

References

1998 births
Living people
French acrobatic gymnasts
Female acrobatic gymnasts
Medalists at the Acrobatic Gymnastics World Championships
21st-century French women